State Road 130 (NM 130) is a  state highway in the US state of New Mexico. NM 130's eastern terminus is at U.S. Route 82 (US 82) in Mayhill, and the western terminus is at US 82 in Cloudcroft.

Major intersections

See also

References

130
Transportation in Otero County, New Mexico